The King of Fighters is a series of fighting games developed by SNK. Originally, the series was developed for SNK's Neo Geo MVS arcade systems. This would continue to be the main platform for King of Fighters games until 2004, when SNK Playmore adopted the Atomiswave arcade system as its primary board.  SNK Playmore has since stated that it will release its latest arcade titles for the Taito Type X2 arcade system.

The first game in the series, The King of Fighters '94 was released by SNK on August 25, 1994. The game was originally designed to be a dream match of characters from the company's various arcade titles, particularly Fatal Fury, Art of Fighting, Ikari Warriors, and Psycho Soldier. Sequels from the series have been released each year until The King of Fighters 2003. By 2004, SNK abandoned yearly releases of the series and numbered future games in a more traditional manner. In 2004, SNK produced the first 3D installment of the series, The King of Fighters: Maximum Impact. The game, and its two sequels, revises much of the backstory for characters and settings from previous games.

Several characters from the series also appear in cross-over video games such as the Capcom vs. SNK series. In addition to the remakes of individual games such as Re-bout, Ultimate Match, and Unlimited Match, SNK Playmore has released compilations of their KOF games.

Main series

Orochi Saga

NESTS Saga

Ash Saga

New Age Saga

Spin-offs

Fighting

Other

Compilations and remakes

Related games

References

External links

King of Fighters